Butterfly keyboard may refer to either of two keyboards used on specific laptop computer models:
 IBM ThinkPad 701
 Apple MacBook Pro